Desnogorsk is a town in Smolensk Oblast, Russia, located on the right bank of the Desna River  southeast of Smolensk. Population:  Desnogorsk is located on the banks of the Desna River and is surrounded by Roslavlsky District.

Climate
Desnogorsk has a warm-summer humid continental climate (Dfb in the Köppen climate classification).

<div style="width:70%;">

History
It was founded as a settlement around the Smolensk Nuclear Power Plant in 1974 (construction started in 1972). It belonged to Roslavlsky District. It was granted town status in 1989 and simultaneously declared to be the town of oblast significance.

Administrative and municipal status
Within the framework of administrative divisions, it is, together with one rural locality, incorporated as Desnogorsk Urban Okrug—an administrative unit with the status equal to that of the districts. As a municipal division, this administrative unit also has urban okrug status.

Economy

Industry
Smolensk Nuclear Power Plant is the main enterprise in Desnogorsk.

Transportation
The Russian route A130, formerly A101, connecting Moscow with the border of Belarus and continuing to Babruysk, passes close to Desnogorsk.  There is also a connection to the road between Roslavl and Yelnya which continues further via Dorogobuzh and Safonovo to the M1 highway.

There is a railroad in Desnogorsk but no passenger traffic. The closest railway station with passenger traffic is Roslavl I.

References

Notes

Sources

External links

 Official website of Desnogorsk
 Unofficial website of Desnogorsk
 Desnogorsk Business Directory
 Mojgorod.ru. Entry on Desnogorsk 

Cities and towns in Smolensk Oblast
Cities and towns built in the Soviet Union
Populated places established in 1974